Love Destiny is the third single album by Yui Horie. It was released on May 16, 2001 by the label Starchild.

Legacy
The titular song, Love Destiny, was rumored to be the "anthem" of the company, ASCII Media Works, that owns the Sister Princess franchise; as mentioned by Yui Horie in the company-sponsored entertainment event called DENGEKI MUSIC LIVE!!.

Former AKB48 singer Mayu Watanabe cited Love Destiny as her inspiration to be interested in anime according to a joint interview with Yui Horie.

Track listing

References

External links
  Official website > CD section (from the old ASCII Media Works archive)
  Amazon Japan

Sister Princess
Anime songs
2001 singles